Spiby is a surname. Notable people with the surname include:

 Michael Spiby, Australian musician
 Sam Spiby (1877–1953), English footballer